Haycock Creek is a tributary of the Tohickon Creek in Bucks County, Pennsylvania in the United States and is part of the Delaware River watershed.

History
The area surrounding Haycock Creek was first inhabited by the Lenape people. After the arrival of Europeans, the first to purchase land in the area was John Anderson. The first settler was Edward McCarty who purchased land from Thomas and John Penn. Descendants of McCarty occupied mostly the Nockamixon Township side of Haycock Creek. The Frankenfield family were early landowners on the Haycock Township side. As early as 1742 Jesuit fathers from Goshenhoppen began to hold services at McCarty's house and continued until 1798 when the Saint John the Baptist parish was established, the first Catholic Church was built for $150 on land donated by Edward McCarty's nephew John. The current building was constructed in 1854.

Statistics
Haycock Creek's GNIS (United States Geological Survey) identification number is 1209301, its Pennsylvania Department of Conservation and Natural Resources identification number is 03154.

Course
Its confluence with the Tohickon in the lake is the four corners of Bedminster, Haycock, Nockamixon, and Tinicum Townships. It has four tributaries, two from the right and two from the left banks.

Geology
Appalachian Highlands Division
Piedmont Province
Gettysburg-Newark Lowland Section
Brunswick Formation
Diabase

The Brunswick Formation is a sedimentary layer of rock consisting of mudstone, siltstone, and beds of green, brown, and red-brown shale. Mineralogy consists of argillite and hornfels. About 200 million years ago, magma intruded into the Brunswick and cooled quickly forming a fine grained diabase consisting of primarily labradorite and augite. Haycock Mountain (on the right bank of the creek) and several other features in the area are remnants of the intrusion after the Brunswick has eroded away over time. The first one-third or so if Haycock Creek's course is located in a region of diabase rock which intruded into the local sedimentary layers of the Brunswick Formation during the Jurassic and the Triassic, then the remaining course flows over the Brunswick Formation.

Crossings and Bridges

References

Rivers of Bucks County, Pennsylvania
Rivers of Pennsylvania
Tributaries of Tohickon Creek